Namibia Women's Action for Equality Party was a political party in Namibia. It was formed on 20 July 1994 by Ilenikelao Nhinda Latvio. The party never gained many members and never took part in an election.

References

Defunct political parties in Namibia
Political parties established in 1994
1994 establishments in Namibia
Feminist parties in Africa
Feminist organisations in Namibia